The New York Rubber Company was a company that produced rubber located in Beacon, New York. Actor Robert Montgomery's father was President of the company.

A second company, Winslow Life Raft Company was founded as the New York Rubber Company in 1941.

Defunct manufacturing companies based in New York (state)